Anisomeridium lateriticum is a species of saxicolous (rock-dwelling) lichen in the family Monoblastiaceae. Found in Brazil, it was formally described as a new species in 2013 by lichenologists André Aptroot and Marcela Cáceres. The type specimen was collected by the authors in Fazenda São Francisco north of Porto Velho (Rondônia), where it was found growing on lateritic rock in a primary rainforest.

Description

The lichen is inconspicuous, with a brownish-grey color and a very thin and glossy thallus. Ascomata were not observed during the study. The ostiole has partly brown and partly hyaline septate  that measure between 20 and 100 by 4 to 6 μm. The  are hyaline and bacillary, ranging from simple to 1-septate, and measure between 8 and 11 by 2.0 to 2.5 μm. They often have additional  or oil globules.

No lichen products were detected in Anisomeridium lateriticum.

References

Dothideomycetes
Lichen species
Lichens described in 2013
Lichens of Brazil
Taxa named by André Aptroot
Taxa named by Marcela Cáceres